Felix O'Neill may refer to:

Félix O'Neill (1800-1870), a mayor of Ponce, Puerto Rico
Felix O'Neill (died 1709), Irish nobleman
Felim O'Neill of Kinard, Irish nobleman